Mordellistena sibirica is a species of beetle in the genus Mordellistena of the family Mordellidae. It was described by Ermisch in 1977.

References

External links
Coleoptera. BugGuide.

Beetles described in 1977
sibirica